Alistair Barrie is a British actor, writer and stand-up comedian.

Barrie has performed in the UK and Ireland, as well as  Australia, America, Switzerland, The Netherlands, South Africa, Estonia, Mumbai, Cyprus, Crete, Luxembourg, Bahrain, Qatar, Belgium, Prague, Dubai, Doha, Bahrain, Abu Dhabi, Norway, Hong Kong, Macau, Malta, Singapore, Indonesia and Athens.

Barrie has also performed four solo shows at the Edinburgh Festival Fringe, as well as hosting the Main Arena at The Cape Town Comedy Festival and at The Altitude Festival in Meribel. He has performed at most of the UK's major music festivals including Reading, Leeds, The Big Chill and Latitude and is a regular member of The Cutting Edge - the weekly satirical and topical show at The Comedy Store, London. He has also made numerous appearances on both television and radio.

In addition to The World Stands Up (broadcast in the UK, US and Australia), more recent credits include Champagne Comedy (Australia) Richard & Judy (Ch 4), Green Wing (Ch 4), The Blame Game (regular panelist - BBC Ulster & Radio Ulster), Loose Ends (R4), and The Sandi Toksvig Show (LBC).

External links
 http://www.alistairbarrie.com/
Chortle review

Living people
English male comedians
English male television actors
English stand-up comedians
20th-century English comedians
21st-century British comedians
Year of birth missing (living people)